Mega Food Park is a scheme of the Ministry of Food Processing (part of the Government of India) with the aim of establishing a "direct linkage from farm to processing and then to consumer markets" through a network of collection centres and primary processing centres. Its purpose was to increase processing of perishables from 6% to 20% and to increase India's share in global food trade by at least 3% up to year 2015.

According to an estimate, the Indian food industry was to grow from $200 million USD to $310 million USD in 2015 by this plan.

Highlights of scheme
 Government provides grants up to Rs 50 crores for each food park to a consortium of companies.
 30-35 food processing units are expected to be established.
 Collective investment of companies is expected to be at least 250 crores.
 A turnover of 400-500 crore and employment generation of at least 30000 from each mega food park is expected.
A total of 42 Mega Food Parks have been sanctioned so far by MoFPI in six phases. These MFPs are to ensure backward linkages to the farmers, SHGs, JLVs etc. & enhance farmer income. Each MFP is supposed to connect with 25000 farmers. Government has envisaged building quality labs at each of the food parks as well

Status
A sanction of 42 food parks has been planned, out of which 25 in various states have already been sanctioned with 17 pending, expression of interest is available from companies with the government. According to the Government, as of October 2016, 8 mega food parks have become operational and all 42 would be operational in the next 2 years.

References

Government schemes in India
Food processing industry in India
Modi administration initiatives
Proposed infrastructure in India